Hans Mitt (10 December 1884 Voltveti Parish (now Saarde Parish), Kreis Pernau – 27 January 1968) was an Estonian politician. He was a member of I Riigikogu. On 7 January 1921, he resigned his position and he was replaced by Ado Rõõmussaar.

References

1884 births
1968 deaths
People from Saarde Parish
People from Kreis Pernau
Farmers' Assemblies politicians
Members of the Riigikogu, 1920–1923
Members of the Riigikogu, 1923–1926